This partial list of city nicknames in Maryland compiles the aliases, sobriquets and slogans that cities in Maryland are known by (or have been known by historically), officially and unofficially, to municipal governments, local people, outsiders or their tourism boards or chambers of commerce. City nicknames can help in establishing a civic identity, helping outsiders recognize a community or attracting people to a community because of its nickname; promote civic pride; and build community unity. Nicknames and slogans that successfully create a new community "ideology or myth" are also believed to have economic value. Their economic value is difficult to measure, but there are anecdotal reports of cities that have achieved substantial economic benefits by "branding" themselves by adopting new slogans.

Some unofficial nicknames are positive, while others are derisive. The unofficial nicknames listed here have been in use for a long time or have gained wide currency.

List of nicknames
Annapolis 
Crabtown
Naptown
Baltimore
America's Comeback City
Bodymore, Murdaland
Charm CityPopik, Barry."Charm City (summary)". The Big Apple. Nicknames of Other Places. March 25, 2005. URL retrieved on May 5, 2007.
The City of Firsts 
The City That Reads
Crab Cake Capital of the World
The Greatest City in America
Harm City
MobtownSmith, Van. "Mob Rules" . Baltimore City Paper. October 6, 2004. URL retrieved on January 27, 2007.
Monument City
Columbia – The Next America
Crisfield – Seafood Capital of the World
Cumberland – Queen City of the Alleghenies
Ellicott City – Little Sneedville
Frederick 
Key City 
Hagerstown
Hub City
Maryland's Gateway to the West
Takoma Park
Azalea City
The People's Republic of Takoma Park

See also
 List of city nicknames in the United States

References

Maryland cities and towns
Populated places in Maryland
City nicknames